The leader of the Official Opposition, formally known as the leader of His Majesty's Loyal Opposition, is the member of the Legislative Assembly (MLA) who leads the Official Opposition, typically the second largest party in the provincial legislature.

Rachel Notley, who leads the New Democratic Party (NDP), has served as the leader of the Opposition since April 30, 2019.

Alberta has enjoyed long periods of stable government rule, and has elected massive government majority during almost every election in its history. In most other legislatures in Canada, the opposition party is traditionally recognized as a government in waiting, and will alternate periods of government among two or three parties. In Alberta however the opposition has traditionally been very small in terms of seat numbers, and highly unstable in terms of party leadership.

Until Jason Kenney‘s United Conservative Party (UCP) formed government in 2019, Peter Lougheed was the only leader of the Opposition who has ever gone on to become Premier of Alberta. Until 2019, Harry Strom, whom Lougheed defeated, was the only premier who has ever gone on to serve as opposition leader.

History

The Conservative and Liberal years (1905 to 1940) 
In the early years of the provincial legislature the opposition was dominated by the Conservative Party. This was a party built on remnants of the old Territorial Conservative Association. The party started out in 1905 forming opposition with only 2 seats in the legislative assembly, and proportionally grew as much as 20 seats in 1921 as Albertans grew tired of the scandals of the Liberal government.

The Conservatives looked poised to form government after a strong showing in the 1917 general election,. However both the Liberals and Conservatives were wiped out of the legislature in the 1921 general election by the United Farmers of Alberta. Albertans still distrusting of old line dominion parties opted instead for a new party that had third party status as the Non-Partisan League of Alberta and later became the United Farmers.

With the Conservatives wiped out of the legislature the Liberals formed the opposition from 1921 to 1926 confined to the cities of Calgary and Edmonton. The Liberals were helped by the fact that the United Farmers did not typically run candidates in the cities. From 1926 to 1940 there was no official opposition leader due to a Speaker's ruling that divided the Official Opposition funding between all the party leaders.  However the Liberals remained the largest opposition party during this period.

A brand new party, Social Credit under William Aberhart, swept to power in the 1935 provincial election never previously having had a seat in the legislature while the United Farmers were completely wiped out.

The Unity Movement to the rise of Lougheed (1940 to 1971) 
Opposition through the 1940s was dominated by the Unity Movement a coalition by Liberal and Conservatives and some former UFA supporters organized by former UFA MP Alfred Speakman to run candidates as Independents, in the 1940 Alberta general election the movement was successful at forming a large opposition that nearly equaled the popular vote of the ruling Alberta Social Credit Party. The Independents however turned out to be conflicted and hard to sustain as a united force. From 1940 to 1944 the leaders of the opposition changed with every legislative session.

The Independents were promoted through a third party group known as the Independent Citizen's Association. The last Independent opposition leader John Percy Page ran for the Citizen's Association in 1948 but was defeated, ending the Unity Movement.

The Independents' popularity started to decline in the late 1940s with newfound prosperity in Alberta and satisfaction with new Premier Ernest Manning as well as the province's business elite and newspaper editorial boards preferring to back Social Credit rather than risk the socialist Co-operative Commonwealth Federation of Alberta coming to power as they had in Saskatchewan in 1944. The Liberal Party's support grew as support for the federal Progressive Conservative Party of Canada declined. The Liberals formed the official opposition from 1951 until the 1967 general election when the Progressive Conservatives shocked the province by winning 6 seats.

In the 1959 general election, 3 opposition parties managed to each win one seat in the legislature, no opposition leader was named until after the 1963 general election.

The Progressive Conservatives led by Peter Lougheed grew to 10 members through winning 2 by-elections and 2 floor crossings. The Progressive Conservatives defeated the 35 year rule of Social Credit in the 1971 general election and held government until 2015.

Modern day opposition (1971 to present) 

From 1971 to 1982 the remains of the former Social Credit government held the opposition, but they were unable to make a smooth transition and did not elect any new members in this period. Having spent virtually all of its history as the ruling party, they were unprepared for a role outside of government and sank into near-paralysis in opposition. The party collapsed in 1982, when its last two caucus members left to sit as independents. The party has not been a significant force in Alberta since.

After the 1982 general election the speaker of the Legislative Assembly had to make a controversial ruling: whether to accept the two former Social Credit members' bid to become the official opposition, or decide if it should go to the NDP, which held two seats. The speaker ruled in favour of the NDP. The new opposition status would help the party grow to 16 seats from 1986 to 1993 until they were wiped out of the legislature by popular Liberal leader Laurence Decore.

The Liberals once again became the official opposition for the first time since 1967 under Laurence Decore, who helped the Liberals soar to popularity not seen since the early 1900s. Decore however did not last long as his health started to fail, and as he was pressured by party insiders to resign since many in the caucus were disappointed that they did not win the 1993 election. The Liberal party lost popularity as the Progressive Conservatives recovered support under Ralph Klein. In the 2004 general election the Liberals gained 16 seats under Kevin Taft. The Liberals held onto official opposition until 2012, when they were replaced by the Wildrose Party under Danielle Smith in the 2012 general election. On December 17, 2014, most of the Wildrose caucus, including Smith, crossed the floor to the Progressive Conservative government, leaving the Wildrose and Liberal parties tied with 5 seats each. The Liberals petitioned the speaker to be declared the Official Opposition but on December 23, 2014, Speaker Gene Zwozdesky ruled that Wildrose would keep Official Opposition status due to incumbency.

List of opposition leaders

See also
Leader of the Opposition
List of Alberta provincial ministers
List of Alberta premiers

Notes

References
Leaders of the official opposition 1906 to 1971 Alberta Hansard
Alberta Leaders of the Opposition

Politics of Alberta
Alberta
Lists of political office-holders in Alberta